Mitt julkort is a 1994 Jenny Öhlund Christmas album, and her debut album as a solo artist, though members of her former band, Candela, also contribute. The CD version was released through the KM label, and the cassette tape through the Mariann label.

Track listing
Låt julen förkunna (Happy Christmas (War Is Over)) (J. Lennon-J. Ono-P. Bäckman)
Jingeling, tingeling (Sleigh Ride) (L. Andersson-M. Parish-B. Wolgers)
Julen är här (B. Butt/S. Rydell)
Julen är här i vårt hus (Rockin' Around the Christmas Tree) (J. Marks-K. Almgren)
Gläns över sjö och strand (A. Tegner-V. Rydberg)
Jag såg mamma kyssa tomten (I Saw Mommy Kissing Santa Claus) (T. Connor-Ninita)
Hemmets jul (R. Cedermark)
Jag drömmer om en jul hemma (White Christmas) (I. Berlin-Karl-Lennart)
Rudolf med röda mulen (Rudolph the Red-Nosed Reindeer) (J. Marks-E. Sandström)
Natten tänder ljus på himlen (L. Andersson-C. von Melen)
Det hände sig för länge sedan (Mary's Boychild) (J. Hairston-J. Erixon-Arr: G. Keller)
Stilla natt (Stille Nacht, heilige Nacht, F. Gruber-O. Mannström Arr: G. Keller)
Den julen (Last Christmas) (G. Michael-Å. Lindfors)
Bella Notte (S. Burke-P. Lee-G. Sandberg-L. Reuterskiöld)
Härlig är jorden (Schönster Herr Jesu, Silesian folksong) (lyrics: Severin-Ingman/Båth-Holmberg) Arr: G.Keller)

References 

Jenny Silver albums
1994 Christmas albums
1994 debut albums
Christmas albums by Swedish artists
Schlager Christmas albums